Bisleri may refer to:

 Bisleri, an Indian-based bottled water seller
 Felice Bisleri (1851-1921), an Italian businessman, inventor and chemist
 Franco Bordoni Bisleri (1913-1975), an Italian aviator and racing car driver